Killpoint is a 1984 American action film directed by Frank Harris that stars Richard Roundtree, Cameron Mitchell, Leo Fong, Stack Pierce, Hope Holiday, and Diane Stevenett.

Synposis
A psychopathic illegal arms dealer, Joe Marks (Mitchell), and his gang headed by Nighthawk (Pierce), rob a National Guard armory with the intent of selling arms to gangs and criminals in Los Angeles. Lt. James Long (Fong), and FBI agent Bill Bryant (Roundtree), go after Marks.

Background
The music for the film was provided by Herman Jeffreys and Darryl Stevenett. Stevenett performed four songs for the film which were I'm Getting Old", "Truck Drivin' Man", "Cheatin' On Yer Daddy", and "Good Men Die Young". Ramona Gibbons sang the Herman Jeffreys composition "Livin' On The Inside".

Two characters in the film were played by genuine law enforcement officers. Captain Michael Farrell who played Lieutenant James Longs boss was Captain Skidmore, a real life police captain.  Captain Farrell was played by real life Special Agent Larry Lunsford.

References

External links
 
 
 MONDO 70: A Wild World of Cinema. Killpoint, March 12, 2009
 RedLetterMedia - Best of the Worst: Biohazard, Slaughter High, and Kill Point
 Movie Guy 24/7 Review

1984 films
1984 action films
Films directed by Frank Harris
1980s English-language films